Plevna may refer to:

 Pleven, Bulgaria, an old name for the city

Canada
 Plevna, Ontario

Finland
 Plevna, Tampere, a former industrial building in Tampere, Finland

Romania
 Plevna, a village in Suharău Commune, Botoşani County
 Plevna, a village in Grebănu Commune, Buzău County
 Plevna, a village in Lupșanu Commune, Călăraşi County
 Plevna, a village in Rediu Commune, Galați County

United States
 Plevna, Alabama
 Plevna, Indiana
 Plevna, Kansas
 Plevna, Montana

See also 
 Siege of Plevna, a major battle of the Russo-Turkish War (1877–1878)